Xian refers to a person or similar entity having a long life or being immortal. The concept of xian has different implications dependent upon the specific context: philosophical, religious, mythological, or other symbolic or cultural occurrence. The Chinese word xian is translatable into English as:
 (in Daoist philosophy and cosmology) spiritually immortal; transcendent human; celestial being 
 (in Daoist religion and pantheon) physically immortal; immortal person; an immortal; saint
 (in Chinese alchemy) alchemist; one who seeks the elixir of life; one who practices longevity techniques
 (or by extension) alchemical, dietary, or qigong methods for attaining immortality
 (in Chinese mythology) wizard; magician; shaman; sorcerer
  (in popular Chinese literature) genie; elf, fairy; nymph;  (xian jing is fairyland, faery)
 (based on the folk etymology for the character , a compound of the characters for person and mountain) sage living high in the mountains; mountain-man; hermit; recluse
 (as a metaphorical modifier) immortal [talent]; accomplished person; celestial [beauty]; marvelous; extraordinary 
(In new-age conception) seeker who takes refuge in immortality (longevity for the realization of divinity); transcended person [self] recoded by the "higher self"; divine soul; fully established being
(In early Tang Dynasty folk religion conception) immortal being part of a small spiritual cabal who had immortal lifespans and supernatural powers, and were enlightened to the works of heaven, which assigned everyone else to a mundane role in the afterlife

Xian semantically developed from meaning spiritual "immortality; enlightenment", to physical "immortality; longevity" involving methods such as alchemy, breath meditation, and tai chi chuan, and eventually to legendary and figurative "immortality".

Victor H. Mair describes the  xian archetype as: 
They are immune to heat and cold, untouched by the elements, and can fly, mounting upward with a fluttering motion. They dwell apart from the chaotic world of man, subsist on air and dew, are not anxious like ordinary people, and have the smooth skin and innocent faces of children. The transcendents live an effortless existence that is best described as spontaneous. They recall the ancient Indian ascetics and holy men known as ṛṣi who possessed similar traits.

The word xian

The most famous Chinese compound of xiān is Bāxiān ( "the Eight Immortals"). Other common words include xiānrén ( sennin in Japanese, "immortal person; transcendent", see Xiānrén Dòng), xiānrénzhăng ( "immortal's palm; cactus"), xiānnǚ ( "immortal woman; female celestial; angel"), and shénxiān ( "gods and immortals; divine immortal"). Besides humans, xiān can also refer to supernatural animals. The mythological húlijīng  (lit. "fox spirit") "fox fairy; vixen; witch; enchantress" has an alternate name of húxiān  (lit. "fox immortal").

The etymology of xiān remains uncertain. The circa 200 CE Shiming, a Chinese dictionary that provided word-pun "etymologies",  defines xiān as "to get old and not die," and explains it as someone who qiān ( "moves into") the mountains."

Edward H. Schafer defined xian as "transcendent, sylph (a being who, through alchemical, gymnastic and other disciplines, has achieved a refined and perhaps immortal body, able to fly like a bird beyond the trammels of the base material world into the realms of aether, and nourish himself on air and dew.)" Schafer noted xian was cognate to xian  "soar up", qian  "remove", and xianxian  "a flapping dance movement"; and compared Chinese yuren  "feathered man; xian" with English peri "a fairy or supernatural being in Persian mythology" (Persian pari from par "feather; wing").

Two linguistic hypotheses for the etymology of xian involve Arabic and Sino-Tibetan languages. Wu and Davis suggested the source was jinn, or jinni "genie" (from Arabic جني jinnī). "The marvelous powers of the Hsien are so like those of the jinni of the Arabian Nights that one wonders whether the Arabic word, jinn, may not be derived from the Chinese Hsien." Axel Schuessler's etymological dictionary suggests a Sino-Tibetan connection between xiān (Old Chinese *san or *sen) "'An immortal' ... men and women who attain supernatural abilities; after death they become immortals and deities who can fly through the air" and Tibetan gšen < g-syen "shaman, one who has supernatural abilities, incl[uding] travel through the air".

The character and its variants

The word xiān is written with three characters 僊, 仙, or 仚, which combine the logographic "radical" rén ( or  "person; human") with two "phonetic" elements (see Chinese character classification). The oldest recorded xiān character  has a xiān ("rise up; ascend") phonetic supposedly because immortals could "ascend into the heavens". (Compare qiān  "move; transfer; change" combining this phonetic and the motion radical.) The usual modern xiān character , and its rare variant , have a shān ( "mountain") phonetic. For a character analysis, Schipper interprets "'the human being of the mountain,' or alternatively, 'human mountain'. The two explanations are appropriate to these beings: they haunt the holy mountains, while also embodying nature."

The Classic of Poetry (220/3) contains the oldest occurrence of the character , reduplicated as xiānxiān ( "dance lightly; hop about; jump around"), and rhymed with qiān. "But when they have drunk too much, Their deportment becomes light and frivolous—They leave their seats, and [] go elsewhere, They keep [] dancing and capering." (tr. James Legge) Needham and Wang suggest xian was cognate with wu  "shamanic" dancing. Paper writes, "the function of the term xian in a line describing dancing may be to denote the height of the leaps. Since, "to live for a long time" has no etymological relation to xian, it may be a later accretion."

Textual references

This section chronologically reviews how Chinese texts describe xian "immortals; transcendents". While the early Zhuangzi, Chuci, and Liezi texts allegorically used xian immortals and magic islands to describe spiritual immortality, later ones like the Shenxian zhuan and Baopuzi took immortality literally and described esoteric Chinese alchemical techniques for physical longevity.

On one the hand, neidan ( "internal alchemy") techniques included taixi ( "embryonic respiration") breath control, meditation, visualization, sexual training, and Tao Yin exercises (which later evolved into qigong and tai chi chuan).

On the other hand, waidan ( "external alchemy") techniques for immortality included alchemical recipes, magic plants, rare minerals, herbal medicines, drugs, and dietetic techniques like inedia.
The word yuren  "feathered person" later meant "Daoist").

Besides the following major Chinese texts, many others use both graphic variants of xian. Xian occurs in the Chunqiu Fanlu, Fengsu Tongyi, Qian fu lun, Fayan, and Shenjian; xian occurs in the Caizhong langji, Fengsu Tongyi, Guanzi, and Shenjian.

Zhuangzi
Two circa 3rd century BCE "Outer Chapters" of the Zhuangzi ( "[Book of] Master Zhuang") use the archaic character xian . Chapter 11 has a parable about "Cloud Chief"  and "Big Concealment" that uses the Shijing compound xianxian ("dance; jump"):
Big Concealment said, "If you confuse the constant strands of Heaven and violate the true form of things, then Dark Heaven will reach no fulfillment. Instead, the beasts will scatter from their herds, the birds will cry all night, disaster will come to the grass and trees, misfortune will reach even to the insects. Ah, this is the fault of men who 'govern'!""Then what should I do?" said Cloud Chief."Ah," said Big Concealment, "you are too far gone! [] Up, up, stir yourself and be off!"Cloud Chief said, "Heavenly Master, it has been hard indeed for me to meet with you—I beg one word of instruction!""Well, then—mind‑nourishment!" said Big Concealment. "You have only to rest in inaction and things will transform themselves. Smash your form and body, spit out hearing and eyesight, forget you are a thing among other things, and you may join in great unity with the deep and boundless. Undo the mind, slough off spirit, be blank and soulless, and the ten thousand things one by one will return to the root—return to the root and not know why. Dark and undifferentiated chaos—to the end of life none will depart from it. But if you try to know it, you have already departed from it. Do not ask what its name is, do not try to observe its form. Things will live naturally end of themselves."Cloud Chief said, "The Heavenly Master has favored me with this Virtue, instructed me in this Silence. All my life I have been looking for it, and now at last I have it!" He bowed his head twice, stood up, took his leave, and went away. (11)

Chapter 12 uses xian when mythical Emperor Yao describes a shengren ( "sagely person").
The true sage is a quail at rest, a little fledgling at its meal, a bird in flight who leaves no trail behind. When the world has the Way, he joins in the chorus with all other things. When the world is without the Way, he nurses his Virtue and retires in leisure. And after a thousand years, should he weary of the world, he will leave it and [] ascend to [] the immortals, riding on those white clouds all the way up to the village of God. (12)

Without using the word xian, several Zhuangzi passages employ xian imagery, like flying in the clouds, to describe individuals with superhuman powers. For example, Chapter 1, within the circa 3rd century BCE "Inner Chapters", has two portrayals. First is this description of Liezi (below).
Lieh Tzu could ride the wind and go soaring around with cool and breezy skill, but after fifteen days he came back to earth. As far as the search for good fortune went, he didn't fret and worry. He escaped the trouble of walking, but he still had to depend on something to get around. If he had only mounted on the truth of Heaven and Earth, ridden the changes of the six breaths, and thus wandered through the boundless, then what would he have had to depend on? Therefore, I say, the Perfect Man has no self; the Holy Man has no merit; the Sage has no fame. (1) 

Second is this description of a shenren ( "divine person").
He said that there is a Holy Man living on faraway [] Ku-she Mountain, with skin like ice or snow, and gentle and shy like a young girl. He doesn't eat the five grains, but sucks the wind, drinks the dew, climbs up on the clouds and mist, rides a flying dragon, and wanders beyond the Four Seas. By concentrating his spirit, he can protect creatures from sickness and plague and make the harvest plentiful. (1) 

The authors of the Zhuangzi had a lyrical view of life and death, seeing them as complementary aspects of natural changes. This is antithetical to the physical immortality (changshengbulao  "live forever and never age") sought by later Daoist alchemists. Consider this famous passage about accepting death.
Chuang Tzu's wife died. When Hui Tzu went to convey his condolences, he found Chuang Tzu sitting with his legs sprawled out, pounding on a tub and singing. "You lived with her, she brought up your children and grew old," said Hui Tzu. "It should be enough simply not to weep at her death. But pounding on a tub and singing—this is going too far, isn't it?"

Chuang Tzu said, "You're wrong. When she first died, do you think I didn't grieve like anyone else? But I looked back to her beginning and the time before she was born. Not only the time before she was born, but the time before she had a body. Not only the time before she had a body, but the time before she had a spirit. In the midst of the jumble of wonder and mystery a change took place and she had a spirit. Another change and she had a body. Another change and she was born. Now there's been another change and she's dead. It's just like the progression of the four seasons, spring, summer, fall, winter.""Now she's going to lie down peacefully in a vast room. If I were to follow after her bawling and sobbing, it would show that I don't understand anything about fate. So I stopped. (18) 

Alan Fox explains this anecdote about Zhuangzi's wife.
Many conclusions can be reached on the basis of this story, but it seems that death is regarded as a natural part of the ebb and flow of transformations which constitute the movement of Dao. To grieve over death, or to fear one's own death, for that matter, is to arbitrarily evaluate what is inevitable. Of course, this reading is somewhat ironic given the fact that much of the subsequent Daoist tradition comes to seek longevity and immortality, and bases some of their basic models on the Zhuangzi.

Chuci
The 3rd-2nd century BCE Chuci ( "Lyrics of Chu") anthology of poems uses xian  once and xian  twice, reflecting the disparate origins of the text. These three contexts mention the legendary Daoist xian immortals Chi Song ( "Red Pine", and Wang Qiao (or Zi Qiao ). In later Daoist hagiography, Chi Song was Lord of Rain under Shennong, the legendary inventor of agriculture; and Wang Qiao was a son of King Ling of Zhou (r. 571–545 BCE), who flew away on a giant white bird, became an immortal and was never again seen.

Yuan You
The "Yuan You" ( "Far-off Journey") poem describes a spiritual journey into the realms of gods and immortals, frequently referring to Daoist myths and techniques.
My spirit darted forth and did not return to me,And my body, left tenantless, grew withered and lifeless.Then I looked into myself to strengthen my resolution,And sought to learn from where the primal spirit issues.In emptiness and silence I found serenity;In tranquil inaction I gained true satisfaction.I heard how once Red Pine had washed the world's dust off:I would model myself on the pattern he had left me.I honoured the wondrous powers of the [] Pure Ones,And those of past ages who had become [] Immortals.They departed in the flux of change and vanished from men's sight,Leaving a famous name that endures after them.

Xi shi
The "Xi shi" ( "Sorrow for Troth Betrayed") resembles the "Yuan You", and both reflect Daoist ideas from the Han period. "Though unoriginal in theme," says Hawkes, "its description of air travel, written in a pre-aeroplane age, is exhilarating and rather impressive."
We gazed down of the Middle Land [China] with its myriad peopleAs we rested on the whirlwind, drifting about at random.In this way we came at last to the moor of Shao-yuan:There, with the other blessed ones, were Red Pine and Wang Qiao.The two Masters held zithers tuned in perfect concord:I sang the Qing Shang air to their playing.In tranquil calm and quiet enjoyment,Gently I floated, inhaling all the essences.But then I thought that this immortal life of [] the blessed,Was not worth the sacrifice of my home-returning.

Ai shi ming
The "Ai shi ming" ( "Alas That My Lot Was Not Cast") describes a celestial journey similar to the previous two.
Far and forlorn, with no hope of return:Sadly I gaze in the distance, over the empty plain.Below, I fish in the valley streamlet;Above, I seek out [] holy hermits.I enter into friendship with Red Pine;I join Wang Qiao as his companion.
We send the Xiao Yang in front to guide us;The White Tiger runs back and forth in attendance.Floating on the cloud and mist, we enter the dim height of heaven;Riding on the white deer we sport and take our pleasure.

Li Sao
The "Li Sao" ( "On Encountering Trouble"), the most famous Chuci poem, is usually interpreted as describing ecstatic flights and trance techniques of Chinese shamans. The above three poems are variations describing Daoist xian.

Some other Chuci poems refer to immortals with synonyms of xian. For instance, "Shou zhi" ( "Maintaining Resolution), uses zhenren ( "true person", tr. "Pure Ones" above in "Yuan You"), which Wang Yi's commentary glosses as zhen xianren ( "true immortal person").
I visited Fu Yue, bestriding a dragon,Joined in marriage with the Weaving Maiden,Lifted up Heaven's Net to capture evil,Drew the Bow of Heaven to shoot at wickedness,Followed the [真人] Immortals fluttering through the sky,Ate of the Primal Essence to prolong my life.

Liezi
The Liezi ( "[Book of] Master Lie"), which Louis Komjathy says "was probably compiled in the 3rd century CE (while containing earlier textual layers)", uses xian four times, always in the compound xiansheng ( "immortal sage").

Nearly half of Chapter 2 ("The Yellow Emperor") comes from the Zhuangzi, including this recounting of the above fable about Mount Gushe (or Guye, or Miao Gushe ).
The Ku-ye mountains stand on a chain of islands where the Yellow River enters the sea. Upon the mountains there lives a Divine Man, who inhales the wind and drinks the dew, and does not eat the five grains. His mind is like a bottomless spring, his body is like a virgin's. He knows neither intimacy nor love, yet [] immortals and sages serve him as ministers. He inspires no awe, he is never angry, yet the eager and diligent act as his messengers. He is without kindness and bounty, but others have enough by themselves; he does not store and save, but he himself never lacks. The Yin and Yang are always in tune, the sun and moon always shine, the four seasons are always regular, wind and rain are always temperate, breeding is always timely, the harvest is always rich, and there are no plagues to ravage the land, no early deaths to afflict men, animals have no diseases, and ghosts have no uncanny echoes. 

Chapter 5 uses xiansheng three times in a conversation set between legendary rulers Tang of the Shang Dynasty and Ji of the Xia Dynasty.
T'ang asked again: 'Are there large things and small, long and short, similar and different?'—'To the East of the Gulf of Chih-li, who knows how many thousands and millions of miles, there is a deep ravine, a valley truly without bottom; and its bottomless underneath is named "The Entry to the Void". The waters of the eight corners and the nine regions, the stream of the Milky Way, all pour into it, but it neither shrinks nor grows. Within it there are five mountains, called Tai-yü, Yüan-chiao, Fang-hu, Ying-chou and P'eng-Iai. These mountains are thirty thousand miles high, and as many miles round; the tablelands on their summits extend for nine thousand miles. It is seventy thousand miles from one mountain to the next, but they are considered close neighbours. The towers and terraces upon them are all gold and jade, the beasts and birds are all unsullied white; trees of pearl and garnet always grow densely, flowering and bearing fruit which is always luscious, and those who eat of it never grow old and die. The men who dwell there are all of the race of [] immortal sages, who fly, too many to be counted, to and from one mountain to another in a day and a night. Yet the bases of the five mountains used to rest on nothing; they were always rising and falling, going and returning, with the ebb and flow of the tide, and never for a moment stood firm. The [] immortals found this troublesome, and complained about it to God. God was afraid that they would drift to the far West and he would lose the home of his sages. So he commanded Yü-ch'iang to make fifteen [] giant turtles  carry the five mountains on their lifted heads, taking turns in three watches, each sixty thousand years long; and for the first time the mountains stood firm and did not move.'But there was a giant from the kingdom of the Dragon Earl, who came to the place of the five mountains in no more than a few strides. In one throw he hooked six of the turtles in a bunch, hurried back to his country carrying them together on his back, and scorched their bones to tell fortunes by the cracks. Thereupon two of the mountains, Tai-yü and Yüan-chiao, drifted to the far North and sank in the great sea; the [] immortals who were carried away numbered many millions. God was very angry, and reduced by degrees the size of the Dragon Earl's kingdom and the height of his subjects. At the time of Fu-hsi and Shen-nung, the people of this country were still several hundred feet high.' 

Penglai Mountain became the most famous of these five mythical peaks where the elixir of life supposedly grew, and is known as Horai in Japanese legends. The first emperor Qin Shi Huang sent his court alchemist Xu Fu on expeditions to find these plants of immortality, but he never returned (although by some accounts, he discovered Japan).

Holmes Welch analyzed the beginnings of Daoism, sometime around the 4th-3rd centuries BCE, from four separate streams: philosophical Daoism (Laozi, Zhuangzi, Liezi), a "hygiene school" that cultivated longevity through breathing exercises and yoga, Chinese alchemy and Five Elements philosophy, and those who sought Penglai and elixirs of "immortality". This is what he concludes about xian.
It is my own opinion, therefore, that though the word hsien, or Immortal, is used by Chuang Tzu and Lieh Tzu, and though they attributed to their idealized individual the magic powers that were attributed to the hsien in later times, nonetheless the hsien ideal was something they did not believe in—either that it was possible or that it was good. The magic powers are allegories and hyperboles for the natural powers that come from identification with Tao. Spiritualized Man, P'eng-lai, and the rest are features of a genre which is meant to entertain, disturb, and exalt us, not to be taken as literal hagiography. Then and later, the philosophical Taoists were distinguished from all other schools of Taoism by their rejection of the pursuit of immortality. As we shall see, their books came to be adopted as scriptural authority by those who did practice magic and seek to become immortal. But it was their misunderstanding of philosophical Taoism that was the reason they adopted it.

Shenxian zhuan
The Shenxian zhuan ( Biographies of Spirit Immortals") is a hagiography of xian. Although it was traditionally attributed to Ge Hong (283–343 CE), Komjathy says, "The received versions of the text contain some 100-odd hagiographies, most of which date from 6th-8th centuries at the earliest."

According to the Shenxian zhuan, there are four schools of immortality:

Qì (—"energy"): Breath control and meditation. Those who belong to this school can

"...blow on water and it will flow against its own current for several paces; blow on fire, and it will be extinguished; blow at tigers or wolves, and they will crouch down and not be able to move; blow at serpents, and they will coil up and be unable to flee. If someone is wounded by a weapon, blow on the wound, and the bleeding will stop. If you hear of someone who has suffered a poisonous insect bite, even if you are not in his presence, you can, from a distance, blow and say in incantation over your own hand (males on the left hand, females on the right), and the person will at once be healed even if more than a hundred li away. And if you yourself are struck by a sudden illness, you have merely to swallow pneumas in three series of nine, and you will immediately recover.But the most essential thing [among such arts] is fetal breathing. Those who obtain [the technique of] fetal breathing become able to breathe without using their nose or mouth, as if in the womb, and this is the culmination of the way [of pneumatic cultivation]." 

Fàn (—"Diet"): Ingestion of herbal compounds and abstention from the Sān Shī Fàn (—"Three-Corpses food")—Meats (raw fish, pork, dog, leeks, and scallions) and grains. The Shenxian zhuan uses this story to illustrate the importance of bigu "grain avoidance":
"During the reign of Emperor Cheng of the Han, hunters in the Zhongnan Mountains saw a person who wore no clothes, his body covered with black hair. Upon seeing this person, the hunters wanted to pursue and capture him, but the person leapt over gullies and valleys as if in flight, and so could not be overtaken. [But after being surrounded and captured, it was discovered this person was a 200 plus year old woman, who had once been a concubine of Qin Emperor Ziying. When he had surrendered to the 'invaders of the east', she fled into the mountains where she learned to subside on 'the resin and nuts of pines' from an old man. Afterwards, this diet 'enabled [her] to feel neither hunger nor thirst; in winter [she] was not cold, in summer [she] was not hot.']The hunters took the woman back in. They offered her grain to eat. When she first smelled the stink of grain, she vomited, and only after several days could she tolerate it. After little more than two years of this [diet], her body hair fell out; she turned old and died. Had she not been caught by men, she would have become a transcendent." 

Fángzhōng Zhī Shù (—"Arts of the Bedchamber"): Sexual yoga. According to a discourse between the Yellow Emperor and the immortaless Sùnǚ (—"Plain Girl"), one of the three daughters of Hsi Wang Mu,
 "The sexual behaviors between a man and woman are identical to how the universe itself came into creation. Like Heaven and Earth, the male and female share a parallel relationship in attaining an immortal existence. They both must learn how to engage and develop their natural sexual instincts and behaviors; otherwise the only result is decay and traumatic discord of their physical lives. However, if they engage in the utmost joys of sensuality and apply the principles of yin and yang to their sexual activity, their health, vigor, and joy of love will bear them the fruits of longevity and immortality. 

The White Tigress (Zhuang Li Quan Pure Angelic Metal Ajna Empress "Toppest") Manual, a treatise on female sexual yoga, states,
 "A female can completely restore her youthfulness and attain immortality if she refrains from allowing just one or two men in her life from stealing and destroying her [sexual] essence, which will only serve in aging her at a rapid rate and bring about an early death. However, if she can acquire the sexual essence of a thousand males through absorption, she will acquire the great benefits of youthfulness and immortality." 

Dān (丹—"Alchemy", literally "Cinnabar"): Elixir of Immortality.

Baopuzi
The 4th century CE Baopuzi ( "[Book of] Master Embracing Simplicity"), which was written by Ge Hong, gives some highly detailed descriptions of xian.

The text lists three classes of immortals:

Tiānxiān (—"Celestial Immortal"): The highest level.
Dìxiān (—"Earth Immortal"): The middle level.
Shījiě xiān (—"Escaped-by-means-of-a-stimulated-corpse-simulacrum Immortal", literally "Corpse Untie Immortal"): The lowest level. This is considered the lowest form of immortality since a person must first "fake" their own death by substituting a bewitched object like a bamboo pole, sword, talisman or a shoe for their corpse or slipping a type of Death certificate into the coffin of a newly departed paternal grandfather, thus having their name and "allotted life span" deleted from the ledgers kept by the Sīmìng (—"Director of allotted life spans", literally "Controller of Fate"). Hagiographies and folktales abound of people who seemingly die in one province, but are seen alive in another. Mortals who choose this route must cut off all ties with family and friends, move to a distant province, and enact the Ling bao tai xuan yin sheng zhi fu (—"Numinous Treasure Talisman of the Grand Mystery for Living in Hiding") to protect themselves from heavenly retribution. However, this is not a true form of immortality. For each misdeed a person commits, the Director of allotted life spans subtracts days and sometimes years from their allotted life span. This method allows a person to live out the entirety of their allotted lifespan (whether it be 30, 80, 400, etc.) and avoid the agents of death. But the body still has to be transformed into an immortal one, hence the phrase Xiānsǐ hòutuō (—"The 'death' is apparent, [but] the sloughing off of the body's mortality remains to be done."). Sometimes the Shījiě are employed by heaven to act as celestial peace keepers. Therefore, they have no need for hiding from retribution since they are empowered by heaven to perform their duties. There are three levels of heavenly Shījiě:
Dìxià zhǔ (—"Agents Beneath the Earth"): Are in charge of keeping the peace within the Chinese underworld. They are eligible for promotion to earthbound immortality after 280 years of faithful service.
Dìshàng zhǔzhě (—"Agents Above the Earth"): Are given magic talismans which prolong their lives (but not indefinitely) and allow them to heal the sick and exorcize demons and evil spirits from the earth. This level was not eligible for promotion to earthbound immortality.
Zhìdì jūn (—"Lords Who Control the Earth"): A heavenly decree ordered them to "disperse all subordinate junior demons, whether high or low [in rank], that have cause afflictions and injury owing to blows or offenses against the Motion of the Year, the Original Destiny, Great Year, the Kings of the Soil or the establishing or breaking influences of the chronograms of the tome. Annihilate them all." This level was also not eligible for promotion to immortality.

These titles were usually given to humans who had either not proven themselves worthy of or were not fated to become immortals. One such famous agent was Fei Changfang, who was eventually murdered by evil spirits because he lost his book of magic talismans. However, some immortals are written to have used this method in order to escape execution.

Ge Hong wrote in his book The Master Who Embraces Simplicity,
The [immortals] Dark Girl and Plain Girl compared sexual activity as the intermingling of fire [yang/male] and water [yin/female], claiming that water and fire can kill people but can also regenerate their life, depending on whether or not they know the correct methods of sexual activity according to their nature. These arts are based on the theory that the more females a man copulates with, the greater benefit he will derive from the act. Men who are ignorant of this art, copulating with only one or two females during their life, will only suffice to bring about their untimely and early death.

Zhong Lü Chuan Dao Ji

The Zhong Lü Chuan Dao Ji ( "Anthology of the Transmission of the Dao from Zhong[li Quan] to Lü [Dongbin]") is associated with Zhongli Quan (2nd century CE?) and Lü Dongbin (9th century CE), two of the legendary Eight Immortals. It is part of the so-called "Zhong-Lü" textual tradition of internal alchemy (neidan). Komjathy describes it as, "Probably dating from the late Tang (618–906), the text is in question-and-answer format, containing a dialogue between Lü and his teacher Zhongli on aspects of alchemical terminology and methods."

The Zhong Lü Chuan Dao Ji lists five classes of immortals:

Guǐxiān (—"Ghost Immortal"): A person who cultivates too much yin energy. These immortals are likened to Vampires because they drain the life essence of the living, much like the fox spirit. Ghost immortals do not leave the realm of ghosts.
Rénxiān (—Human Immortal"): Humans have an equal balance of yin and yang energies, so they have the potential of becoming either a ghost or immortal. Although they continue to hunger and thirst and require clothing and shelter like a normal human, these immortals do not suffer from aging or sickness. Human immortals do not leave the realm of humans. There are many sub-classes of human immortals, as discussed above under Shījiě xiān.
Dìxiān (—"Earth Immortal"): When the yin is transformed into the pure yang, a true immortal body will emerge that does not need food, drink, clothing or shelter and is not affected by hot or cold temperatures. Earth immortals do not leave the realm of earth. These immortals are forced to stay on earth until they shed their human form.
Shénxiān (—"Spirit Immortal"): The immortal body of the earthbound class will eventually change into vapor through further practice. They have supernatural powers and can take on the shape of any object. These immortals must remain on earth acquiring merit by teaching mankind about the Tao. Spirit immortals do not leave the realm of spirits. Once enough merit is accumulated, they are called to heaven by a celestial decree.
Tiānxiān (—"Celestial Immortal"): Spirit immortals who are summoned to heaven are given the minor office of water realm judge. Over time, they are promoted to oversee the earth realm and finally become administrators of the celestial realm. These immortals have the power to travel back and forth between the earthly and celestial realms.

Śūraṅgama Sūtra

The Śūraṅgama Sūtra, a mahayana Buddhist manuscript, in an approach to Taoist teachings, discusses the characteristics of ten types of xian who exist between the world of devas ("gods") and that of human beings. This position, in Buddhist literature, is usually occupied by asuras ("Titans", "antigods"), but these beings are of another type. These xian are not considered true cultivators of samadhi ("unification of mind"), as their methods differ from the practice of dhyāna ("meditation").

Dìxiān ("earth-travelling immortals") – Xian who constantly ingest special food called fuer.
Fēixiān ("flying immortals") – Xian who constantly ingest certain herbs and plants.
Yóuxiān ("roaming immortals") – Xian who "transform" by constantly ingesting metals and minerals.
Kōngxiān ("void-travelling immortals") – Xian who perfect their qi and essence through unceasing movement and stillness (dongzhi ).
Tiānxiān ("heaven-travelling immortals") – Xian who constantly practice control of their fluids and saliva.
Tōngxiān ("all-penetrating immortals") – Xian who constantly practice the inhalation of unadulterated essences.
Dàoxiān ("immortals of the Way") – Xian who achieve transcendence through unceasing recitation of spells and prohibitions.
Zhàoxiān ("illuminated immortals") – Xian who achieve transcendence through constant periods of thought and recollection.
Jīngxiān ("seminal immortals") – Xian who have mastered the stimuli and responses of intercourse.
Juéxiān ("absolute immortals") – Xian who "have attained the end" and perfected their awakening through constant transformation.

In art and culture
According to Michael Loewe, the earliest artistic and textual evidence of xian transcendents dates from the fifth or fourth centuries BCE. They were depicted as avian and serpentine hybrids who could fly through the universe, typically either combinations of a bird's body and a human face, or a human with wings sprouting on their back, i.e., a yuren (羽人, "feathered person"). In tomb reliefs from the Eastern Han dynasty (25-220 CE), xian are often bird-human and reptile-human hybrids, depicted as "liminal but spiritually empowered figures" who accompanied a deceased person's soul to paradise, "transient figures moving through an intermediate realm" where they are often joined by deer, tigers, dragons, birds, heavenly horses (tianma 天馬), and other animals. These avian, serpentine, and human hybrid xians are frequently depicted with "secondary characteristics" including androgyny, large ears, long hair, exaggerated nonhuman faces, tattoo-like markings, and nudity; many of these traits also appear in depictions of foreigners, who also lived outside the Chinese cultural and spiritual sphere.

Xian are conventionally held to be beings that bring good fortune and "benevolent spirits".

In Japan, sennin image was perpetuated in many legends, art, miniature sculpture (netsuke). Below is a wooden netsuke, made in the 18th century. It represents a perplexed old man with one hand based on the curve of a snag, and the other hand is rubbing his head with concern. He is looking somewhere in the sky and tucked up the right leg. This position betrayed him as Sennin Tekkay, whose soul has found the second life in the body of the lame beggar. In shape the beggarly old man this legendary personality portrayed prominent carver of the early period Jobun.

Sennin is a common Japanese character name. For example, Ikkaku Sennin (一角仙人 "One-horned Immortal") was a Noh play by Komparu Zenpō (金春禅鳳, 1454–1520?). The Japanese legend of Gama Sennin (蝦蟇仙人 "Toad Immortal") is based upon Chinese Liu Hai, a fabled 10th-century alchemist who learned the secret of immortality from the Chan Chu ("Three-legged Money Toad").

Sovereigns

The Three Sovereigns had similarities to xian and could have been considered such.

The Sancai Tuhui, an encyclopedia from 1607, depicts the Human Sovereign as a reptilian being with ears similar to feathers, much like Han Dynasty depictions of xian.

See also

 Shen (Chinese religion)
 Zhenren
 Eight Immortals
 Eight Immortals from Sichuan
 Fu Lu Shou
 Old Man of the South Pole
 Magu
 Xi Wangmu (Queen Mother of the West)
 Temples of the Five Immortals in China:
 In Shiyan, (Hubei)
 In Guangzhou

 Kunlun Mountain in mythology
 Peaches of Immortality
 Xianxia (genre)
 Sansin
 Yama-no-Kami
 Rishi
 Weizza

References
Akahori, Akira. 1989. "Drug Taking and Immortality", in Taoist Meditation and Longevity Techniques, ed. Livia Kohn. Ann Arbor: University of Michigan, pp. 73–98. .
Blofeld, John. 1978. Taoism: The Road to Immortality. Boston: Shambhala. .
 
DeWoskin, Kenneth. 1990. "Xian Descended: Narrating Xian among Mortals." Taoist Resources 1.2:21–27.
 
 
 
Loewe, Michael. 1978. "Man and Beast: The Hybrid in Early Chinese Art and Literature", Numen 25.2, pp. 97-117.
Robinet, Isabel. 1986. "The Taoist Immortal: Jesters of Light and Shadow, Heaven and Earth". Journal of Chinese Religions 13/14:87–106.
Wallace, Leslie V. 2001. "BETWIXT AND BETWEEN: Depictions of Immortals (Xian) in Eastern Han Tomb Reliefs", Ars Orientalis 41: 73-101.
 
 
Wong, Eva. 2000. The Tao of Health, Longevity, and Immortality: The Teachings of Immortals Chung and Lü. Boston: Shambhala.

Footnotes

External links
"Transcendence and Immortality", Russell Kirkland, The Encyclopedia of Taoism
Chapter Seven: Later Daoism, Gregory Smits, Topics in Premodern Chinese History
Xian, Encyclopedia of Religion

Chinese mythology
Life extension
Mythological powers
Taoist philosophy